The 1961–62 St. Francis Terriers men's basketball team represented St. Francis College during the 1961–62 NCAA men's basketball season. The team was coached by Daniel Lynch, who was in his thirteenth year at the helm of the St. Francis Terriers. The team was a member of the Metropolitan New York Conference and played their home games at the 69th Regiment Armory in Manhattan.

The Terriers finished the season at 8–15 overall and 2–3 in conference play.

Roster

Schedule and results

|-
!colspan=12 style="background:#0038A8; border: 2px solid #CE1126;;color:#FFFFFF;"| Regular Season

 

  

 

  
 
|-

References

St. Francis Brooklyn Terriers men's basketball seasons
St. Francis
Saint Francis
Saint Francis